Granblue Fantasy Versus is a 2.5D fighting game developed by Arc System Works for the PlayStation 4. It is based on the role-playing video game Granblue Fantasy, and it was released in Japan and Asia by Cygames, and TSS Ventures (Tencent, Square Enix, and Sega) respectively on February 6, 2020, and North America by Marvelous' Xseed Games on March 3, 2020. Microsoft Windows release was officially announced for March 13, 2020, to commemorate the 6th anniversary of the series. A sequel, Granblue Fantasy Versus: Rising, will be released in 2023.

Gameplay
Granblue Fantasy Versus is mainly a fighting game where the goal is to eliminate the opponent by using a combination of attacks to empty their character's life bar enough times to win the match.  Each character has special abilities called "Skybound Arts," which correspond to skills that the character is able to use in the main Granblue Fantasy game. In an attempt to make the game more accessible to new players, each Skybound Arts can be triggered with a simple button press, but the player will have to wait for a short cooldown period before they can use it again.  However, if the player uses a more advanced combination of movement and button presses to launch the attack, the cooldown time on the skill will be shortened.

The game also contains a story mode called RPG Mode. Unlike the main game mode, RPG Mode is more of a side-scrolling, beat 'em up, action role-playing game, similar to Guilty Gear Judgment. The story mode includes exclusive bosses and minions to battle, setting weapon grids, and a co-op mode.

Characters 
Granblue Fantasy Versus has 12 initial characters. One character is unlockable through the main story, but is also available for purchase in Character Pass 1 for instant access. Following the game's launch, several additional characters were developed and added to the game via Character Passes. Purchasing the Character Pass also provides various bonuses to the main Granblue Fantasy game. In total, there are 25 characters.

 * Unlockable through main story.
 ** Free update character. Lunalu is a random-based character who will use different playable characters in different rounds.

Every characters have additional weapon skin that can be obtain through main story and Battle Pass.

Plot 
In the RPG Mode, Granblue Fantasy Versus features a standalone storyline where players embark on a journey visiting the featured locales within the fighting game. The player takes control of Gran and company to fight other notable characters within the Granblue Fantasy universe visiting various islands and uncovering the mysterious force surrounding the violence and chaos that ensues through quests. Along with meeting the main cast of characters, the player is also introduced to their backstories and existing relationships with other characters.

Development and release 
Granblue Fantasy Versus was developed by Arc System Works for the PlayStation 4, who have developed other titles such as Dragon Ball FighterZ and BlazBlue: Cross Tag Battle in 2018. The creative director, Tetsuya Fukuhara, along with publisher Cygames, wanted to introduce the Western audiences to the Granblue Fantasy franchise. Due to the already established fictional universe and fan base since its initial debut years ago as a role-playing video game, Fukuhara believed that throwing players into the on-going narratives would make it difficult for Western newcomers to be attracted to its universe. Therefore, Fukuhara opted to make a fighting game for the franchise due to their confidence in the popularity of the fighting game genre with Western audiences.

The game was developed with accessibility in mind, sharing a lot of the design philosophies surrounding their recently developed titles Dragon Ball FighterZ and BlazBlue: Cross Tag Battle, with the implementation of mechanics that are to be easier to comprehend. They opted for a more deliberate and simple combat design emphasizing shorter combos and one-button special moves via shortcuts, lowering the barrier of entry for newer players. Tetsuya emphasized that while the fighting game would be considered more beginner-friendly, there would still be room for depth when it comes to competitive play, such as the activation of special moves with shortcuts having a short cooldown period and the player having to strategize around that mechanic unique to Granblue Fantasy Versus. English voice acting was also announced to be included in this game.

Granblue Fantasy Versus was initially released to be exclusively on the PlayStation 4 on February 6, 2020, in Japan and March 3, 2020, in North America. It was later confirmed by publisher Cygames, on February 27, 2020, that the game would be ported to Microsoft Windows on March 13, 2020. However, there were to be no cross-platform functionality between the Windows and PlayStation 4 ports. In-game rewards, in the form of codes, for the Granblue Fantasy mobile game would not be made available for the Windows port of Granblue Fantasy Versus.

The game's director Tetsuya Fukuhara expressed a desire for a sequel to be produced.  Speculation is uncertain on whether Versus will get a PlayStation 5 upgrade with minor updates, a more direct sequel will be made and released on PS5, or if sequel/upgrade plans will fall through entirely. On January 23, 2023, the sequel which also adds a PlayStation 5 version, known as Granblue Fantasy Versus: Rising was announced and expected to be released around 2023.

Reception

The game received "generally favorable reviews" according to review aggregator Metacritic. IGN gave the game an 8 out of 10 calling it another excellent addition to the Arc System Works family. Game Informer gave Granblue Fantasy Versus a 7.75 out of 10, praising for its innovate design in breaking down the barrier of entry for newcomers and putting on a different take with the narrative-driven gameplay of RPG mode, into a fighting game.

Awards
It was nominated for the category of Best Fighting at The Game Awards 2020, losing to Mortal Kombat 11.

Sales 
According to Famitsu, the PlayStation 4 version of Granblue Fantasy Versus was the bestselling retail game during its launch week in Japan, with 86,248 physical copies being sold. The game also debuted at #2 in Taiwan and #4 in South Korea according to Media Create. In its first week debut in Japan, Granblue Fantasy Versus nearly topped the sales charts of its genre, in comparison to other major releases of fighting games within recent years. By November 2020, the game had sold over 450,000 copies worldwide.

See also 
 List of fighting games

References

External links

Cygames official website

2020 video games
Arc System Works games
Crossover fighting games
Esports games
Fantasy video games
Fiction about monsters
Fighting role-playing video games
Fighting games used at the Evolution Championship Series tournament
Granblue Fantasy
Guilty Gear
Multiplayer video games
PlayStation 4 games
Single-player video games
Video games about magic
Video games based on Arthurian legend
Video games developed in Japan
Video games featuring female protagonists
Video games featuring protagonists of selectable gender
Video games scored by Yasunori Nishiki
Video games set on fictional islands
Video games with 2.5D graphics
Video games with cel-shaded animation
Video games with downloadable content
Windows games
Unreal Engine games
Xseed Games games